First United States Army Group (often abbreviated FUSAG) was a fictitious (paper command) Allied Army Group in World War II prior to D-Day, part of Operation Quicksilver, created to deceive the Germans about where the Allies would land in France. To attract Axis attention, prominent US general George S. Patton was placed in command of the fabricated formation.

History
First U.S. Army Group was activated in London in 1943 as the planning formation for the Allied invasion of France under General Omar Bradley. When Twelfth United States Army Group was activated on 1 August 1944, Bradley and his staff transferred to the headquarters of the new army group. Despite a lack of personnel, FUSAG continued to exist on paper as part of the deception of Operation Quicksilver. In order to make the German forces believe the Allied invasion would come at Pas de Calais, the phantom force was stationed at Dover, directly across the English Channel from the site. To further attract the Axis commanders' attention, General Dwight D. Eisenhower placed George S. Patton in command of the phantom force and increased the formation's apparent size to be larger than the British-led 21st Army Group under Bernard Montgomery. Patton was considered by the Germans to be a formidable offensive commander; he was temporarily unemployed as punishment for slapping a battle-fatigued soldier in Sicily.

The deception worked so well that significant German forces remained in the Pas de Calais region for seven weeks after the real invasion at Normandy to defend against what they thought would be the true invasion force.

Agents infiltrated by Germany into the United Kingdom who became double agents acting for Britain in the Double Cross System—notably Juan Pujol García (Garbo)—played a vital role in persuading the Germans that FUSAG was real. After it had become clear that Normandy, not Calais, was the invasion site, to preserve the credibility of the Double Cross network's agents in spite of the totally false information they had persuaded the Germans to believe, the Germans were persuaded that FUSAG had been real, but had been disbanded and attached to the forces at Normandy because the Normandy "diversion" had been so successful that the Calais landing had become unnecessary.

Subordinate units
What follows is the order of battle for the First United States Army Group at one point during Operation Fortitude. The various formations changed as the operation continued in order to mislead Axis intelligence.

  First United States Army Group
  British Fourth Army
  British 2nd Airborne Division; fictitious – Bulford
  British VII Corps
  55th Infantry Division (United States); fictitious – Iceland
  80th Division; fictitious – southern England
  7th, 9th, and 10th US Ranger Battalions; fictitious – Iceland
  British II Corps
  55th (West Lancashire) Infantry Division; notional — Three Bridges
 58th Infantry Division; fictitious — Gravesend
  35th Armoured Brigade; notional — Maresfield
  US 14th Army; fictitious — Little Waltham
  9th Airborne Division; fictitious — Leicester
  21st Airborne Division; fictitious — Fulbeck
  XXXIII Corps; fictitious — HQ Bury St Edmonds
  11th Infantry Division; fictitious — Bury St Edmonds
  48th Infantry Division; fictitious — Woodbridge
  25th Armored Division; fictitious — East Dereham
 XXXVII Corps; fictitious — HQ Chelmsford
  17th Infantry Division; fictitious — Hatfield & Peverel
  59th Infantry Division; fictitious — Ipswich
 Ninth United States Army; became real and deployed to battle September 1944

See also
 Operation Fortitude
 Operation Bodyguard

References

Further reading
 Jon Latimer, Deception in War, London: John Murray, 2001

External links
GlobalSecurity: First US Army Group
 Omar Nelson Bradley, Lt. General FUSAG 12TH AG – Omar Bradley's D-Day June 6, 1944 Maps restored, preserved and displayed at Historical Registry

Operation Quicksilver (deception plan) formations
01